Satama-Sokoura is a town in northeast Ivory Coast. It is a sub-prefecture and commune of Dabakala Department in Hambol Region, Vallée du Bandama District.

In 2014, the population of the sub-prefecture of Satama-Sokoura was 11,603.

Villages
The 10 villages of the sub-prefecture of Satama-Sokoura and their population in 2014 are:

 Kétiébou (610)
 Kongokro (249)
 Mamidougou (567)
 Morifidougou (621)
 Ourognagbélé (514)
 Satama-Sokoura (3 610)
 Kokoumba (1 927)
 Kouroukono Dioulasso (1 397)
 Messarandougou (1 050)
 Sendékou (1 058)

Notes

Sub-prefectures of Hambol
Communes of Hambol